The Upper Hand is a British television sitcom which broadcast on ITV. It was adapted from the American series, Who's the Boss?, created by Martin Cohan and Blake Hunter, who went on to serve as creative consultants for the British version. The series was produced by Central, in association with Columbia Pictures Television, and later Columbia TriStar Central and Carlton Productions. It stars Joe McGann, Diana Weston, Honor Blackman, Kellie Bright and William Puttock.

Series overview

Episodes

Series 1 (1990)

Series 2 (1991)

Series 3 (1991–92)

Series 4 (1992–93)

Series 5 (1993)

Series 6 (1995)

Series 7 (1996)

References

External links

Lists of British sitcom episodes